The MPI MP20C is a switcher diesel locomotive designed and built by MotivePower in Boise, Idaho.

Specifications
It has a  MTU-Detroit Diesel 12V4000 engine. It also includes a C-C wheel arrangement and an optional dynamic brake. It is built on an EMD GP40 frame.

Owners

References

C-C locomotives
Diesel-electric locomotives of the United States
EPA Tier 2-compliant locomotives of the United States
MPI locomotives
Railway locomotives introduced in 2007
Standard gauge locomotives of the United States